Concetta Hospital is a general hospital based in Kinnigoli, Dakshina Kannada District Karnataka, India.

Concetta Hospital, which was started in 1958 with just 12 beds has now grown into a large Hospital having 65 beds with modern equipment and medical facilities available for the patients of the rural area.

Sanjivini, an outreach unit of the hospital, provides a variety of health services to the poor and needy people of Kinnigoli and surrounding villages.

Services available at Concetta Hospital include:
 Out-patient service
 In-patient services
 Maternity service
 24 hours emergency services
 X-Ray, ECG
 Clinical Laboratory
 Ultrasound Facility
 Treatment for snake bites
 Immunization
 Ambulance service

The following specialities and consultations are available:
 Gynacology
 Paediatrics
 Orthopaedics
 General Medicine
 Surgery
 Dermatology
 Dentistry 
 Physiotherapy

References

Hospitals in Karnataka
Education in Dakshina Kannada district
Hospitals established in 1958
1958 establishments in Mysore State